General Arlindo Pena Ben-Ben served as the military commander of UNITA, one of the three liberation movements that fought against Portuguese colonial rule in Angola. After independence, UNITA and the FNLA fought against the MPLA in the Angolan Civil War.

References 

Angolan rebels
Year of birth missing
Year of death missing
Members of UNITA
People of the Angolan Civil War